The Corbett Farm near Echols in rural Echols County, Georgia was listed on the National Register of Historic Places in 2000.

The property includes a farmhouse built ca. 1878-79 plus outbuildings.  The farmhouse is a hall-parlor plan with a rear ell.  It is built with a wood frame joined by mortise-and-tenon joints and it incorporates wooden pegs and square nails.  It has original clapboard siding.

The listing included five contributing buildings and one other contributing structure, plus a non-contributing garage.

Under ownership of Bryant W. Corbett (d.1917), who built the farm, the farm primarily grew peanuts and corn.  The corn was harvested but the peanuts were left in the field to feed hogs that would root them up.

The farm was named a Georgia Centennial Family Farm in 1996 as it had been continuously operated as a farm by one family for over 100 years.

References

Farmhouses in the United States
Buildings and structures in Echols County, Georgia
Houses completed in 1879
Farms on the National Register of Historic Places in Georgia (U.S. state)
Houses on the National Register of Historic Places in Georgia (U.S. state)
National Register of Historic Places in Echols County, Georgia
1879 establishments in Georgia (U.S. state)
Historic farms in the United States
Wooden houses in the United States
Century farms